Euan N.K. Clarkson FRSE (born 1937) is a British palaeontologist and writer.

Career
Euan Clarkson studied geology at the University of Cambridge and had a long career as a palaeontologist at the University of Edinburgh, Scotland. Clarkson's most notable research occurred in the study of trilobites (especially visual systems), Paleozoic stratigraphy and the description of the anatomy of the Conodont animal.

Euan Clarkson has a sustained record of publication and teaching, has authored some 100+ papers and other publications, including a book that is widely regarded as the "standard" palaeontological text for undergraduates.

Clarkson was president of the Edinburgh Geological Society (1985-87), a trustee of the Natural History Museum (1987–92) and president of the Palaeontological Association (1998–2000). Clarkson was awarded the Geological Society of London's Coke medal in 2010.

References

1937 births
Living people
British palaeontologists